Carlota Eugenia Rosenfeld Villarreal (20 June 1943 – 24 July 2020), known as Lotty Rosenfeld, was an interdisciplinary artist based in Santiago, Chile. She was born in Santiago, Chile, and was active during the late 1970s during the time of the Chilean military coup d'état. She carried out public art interventions in urban areas, often manipulating traffic signs in order to challenge viewers to rethink notions of public space and political agency. Her work has been exhibited in several countries throughout Latin America, and Internationally in places such as Europe, Japan, and Australia.

Art movement and involvement in art
Rosenfeld's involvement in art happened during the Chilean military coup d'état period. Under this regime, she utilized her artwork to demonstrate how official power and conflict zones submit bodies to the margins and borders. She wanted to be separate from the guarded spaces of art and its market therefore she used the streets to perform her work, ultimately interrogating political and cultural spaces. With her art, she hoped that she could change the mentality of people by altering history of her country. The initial medium in which she worked was video recording. She then associated herself with Neo-vanguardism and the Escena de Avanzada, a movement of artists and writers that appeared on the Chilean art scene after the 1973 Chilean coup d'état. In 1979, along with poet Raúl Zurita, sociologist Fernando Balcells, writer/artist Diamela Eltit, and artist Juan Castillo, she formed, CADA (Colectivo de Acciones de Arte) or (Art Actions Collective).

CADA is a collective activist and artist group that used interventions and performance to challenge the Pinochet regime in Chile throughout the 1970s and 1980s. She has also been involved with Fluxus, an experimental international interdisciplinary group related to visual arts, music, and literature. Rosenfeld and CADA's work dealt with transforming and intervening in public urban space with the use of symbolism in order to question society's political and authority status. During this period Rosenfeld's work involved performances and video installations. One of her more recent works is titled Mocion de Orden (Motion of Order). This work is a large multimedia installation that was exhibited at the

Una Milla de Cruces Sobre el Pavimento, A Mile of Crosses on the Pavement (1979)
Rosenfeld is best known for her 'art action' entitled Una milla de cruces sobre el pavimento (A Mile of Crosses on the Pavement). Influences of the social reality that frame societies' routines became the physical foundations of her creative interventions. It was begun in Santiago, Chile in 1979. it is one of Rosenfeld's most famous art action pieces. She altered the lines on the pavement, ultimately creating crosses.

With the help of anonymous people on the street, they transformed the painted lines that divide streets into crosses with a perpendicular axis made of white tape. Rosenfeld used straight lines on the pavement as a metaphor for the tightly held control of the Pinochet regime. By altering these often-used markings, she transgresses this subsystem of control and confronts the public with an unexpected subversion of meaning. She converts a minus sign into a plus, to create the +  sign, challenging the idea that signs are fixed, static markings of meaning. The work itself was a performance piece that disrupted every day traffic under the  Pinochet regime.

Artwork
 Una Milla de Cruces Sobre el Pavimento, Art Action/ Video Installation, 1979 
 Inversión Escénica [Scenic Investment], Art Action, 1979
 Una Herida Americana, video Instalación, 1982
 White House. Photography, 1982
 Proposición para (entre) Cruzar Espacios Límites, Video Action, 1983
 Valparaiso- Chile, black and white photography, 1985
 Paz para Sebastián Acevedo, Video Art, 1985
 Moneda
 Metro Wall St. – USA
 Cautivos, Video Instalación, 1989
 El Empeño Latinoamericano, Video Projection and Multimedia Installation, 1999
 Moción de Orden, multimedia installation, 2002
 Cuenta Regresiva, multi video proyección, 2006
 Acción de Arte, Allied Checkpoint, 2007
 Estadio Chile, Chile Triennal, 2009

Publications
 Rosenfeld, Lotty, et al. Lotty Rosenfeld: moción de orden. Ocho Libros Editores, 2002.

Solo exhibitions
 1979/80 Art Action. Una Milla de Cruces Sobre El Pavimiento. Santiago, Chile
 1981 Art Action: Route 68. Santiago-Valparaíso. Atacama Desert. Copiapó, Chile
 1982 Art Action: White House. Washington D.D., USA. Santiago Stock Exchange, Chile
 1983 Art Action: Borders Chile- Argentina. RDA-RFA. Berlin, Germany
 1984 Art Action: Astronomical Observatory, El Tololo. La Serena, Chile
 1985 Art Action: Revolution Square in Havana, Cuba. Civic Center of Santiago, Valparaíso Highway. Santiago, Chile
 1987 Sound Intervention: Courts of Justice of Vancouver, Canada
 1988 Art Action: Diego Portales. Headquarters of the Military Government. Santiago, Chile

Exhibitions
 2002 Lotty Rosenfeld: Moción de orden, Museo de Arte Contemporáneo, Santiago (traveled)
 2007 Documenta 12, Kunsthalle Fridericianum, Kassel, Germany
 2010-11 Dislocación: Cultural Location and Identity in Times of Globalization, Kunstmuseum Bern (traveled)
 2013 Lotty Rosenfeld: Por una poética de la rebeldía, Centro Andaluz de Arte Contemporáneo, Seville, Spain
 2015 Poéticas de la disidencia | Poetics of Dissent, Chilean Pavilion, Biennale Arte 2015, Venice, Italy

Awards and honors
1985 Special Jury Prize at the 1st International Video Biennial in Tokyo
1993 Andes Foundation Scholarship
1995 Chilean Critics Circle National Prize in Visual Arts 
2001 Paoa Prize, 13th International Film Festival in Viña del Mar
2001 Altazor of Engraving and Drawing Prize at las Artes Nacionales
 2015 Represented Chile in the 56th Venice Biennale along with fellow Chilean artist, Paz Errázuriz

Museum collections
 Museo de Arte Contemporáneo, Santiago
 Museo Nacional Centro de Arte Reina Sofía, Madrid
 TATE Gallery, London
 MOMA, New York

Bibliography
 Brito, María Eugenia. Desacato: Sobre la obra de Lotty Rosenfeld. Santiago: F. Zegers, 1986.
 Castillo, Omar-Pascual, and Francis Naranjo. Cada día es +: Juan Castillo, Lotty Rosenfeld. Las Palmas de Gran Canaria, Spain: Centro Atlántico de Arte Moderno, 2013.
 Diamond, Sara. "Art after the Coup: Interventions by Chilean Women." Fuse 11 (April 1988): 15–24.
 Pottlitzer, Joanne. "Lotty Rosenfeld: Visual Artist." Review: Literature and Arts of the Americas 36, no. 66 (2003): 62–73. Richard, Nelly, ed. Poéticas de la disidencia: Paz Errázuriz— Lotty
 Rosenfeld. Barcelona: Polígrafa, 2015.
 Richard, Nelly, ed. Poéticas de la disidencia: Paz Errázuriz—Lotty Rosenfeld. Barcelona: Polígrafa, 2015.

References

External links
 Official website 
 The Chilean Pavilion at the 56th Venice Biennale. The Pavilion was curated by Nelly Richard and included work by Lotty Rosenfeld and Paz Errázuriz.
 Metropollis: Lotty Rosenfeld

1943 births
2020 deaths
Artists from Santiago
20th-century Chilean women artists
21st-century Chilean women artists